A tunnelling shield is a protective structure used during the excavation of large, man-made tunnels. When excavating through ground that is soft, liquid, or otherwise unstable, there is a potential health and safety hazard to workers and the project itself from falling materials or a cave-in. A tunnelling shield can be used as a temporary support structure. It is usually in place for the short-term from when the tunnel section is excavated until it can be lined with a permanent support structure. The permanent structure may be made up of, depending on the period, bricks, concrete, cast iron, or steel. Although modern shields are commonly cylindrical, the first "shield", designed by Marc Isambard Brunel, was actually a large, rectangular, scaffold-like iron structure with three levels and twelve sections per level, with a solid load-bearing top surface. The structure protected the men from cave-ins as they laboured within it, digging the tunnel out in front of the shield.

History
The first successful rectangular tunnelling shield was developed by Marc Isambard Brunel and patented by him and Lord Cochrane in January 1818. Brunel and his son Isambard Kingdom Brunel used it to excavate the Thames Tunnel beginning in 1825 (though the tunnel was not opened until 1843). Brunel is said to have been inspired in his design by the shell of the shipworm, a mollusc whose efficiency at boring through submerged timber he observed while working in a shipyard. The shield was built by Maudslay, Sons & Field of Lambeth, London, who also built the steam pumps for de-watering the tunnel.

In 1840, Alfred Ely Beach, editor of Scientific American journal, was the first to suggest a circular design would be superior to Brunel's rectangular design. In 1868 Beach built a circular shield - a picture of which was printed in a New York news article about his pneumatic tunnel system idea. The design was based upon Brunel's shield lattice and screw-jacked forwards as the face advanced manually.

In 1864 Peter W. Barlow patented a design that had a circular cross-section. Theoretically this made the shield easier to build and better able to support surrounding soil; theoretically, because no shield was ever built using this design. The 1864 Barlow patent was further improved and given a provisional patent in 1868 but never ratified as Barlow died a short time afterwards.

Brunel's original design was substantially improved by James Henry Greathead who was granted three patents for different shield designs. Additionally, he invented the concept of sprayed concrete grout to stabilise earthworks with shot concrete, a gritting pan that hydraulically injected reinforcing grout between the constructed lining and the tunnel wall.

Greathead was the first to ever use a cylindrical tunnelling shield, which he did in the course of the construction of the Tower Subway under the River Thames in central London in 1870.

Greathead also used one in the construction of the City and South London Railway (today part of London Underground's Northern line) in 1884, with tunnels  in diameter. His shield was also used in the driving of the  diameter running tunnels for the Waterloo & City Railway which opened in 1898.

An original Greathead shield used in the excavation of the deep London Underground lines remains in place in disused tunnels beneath Moorgate station.

Most tunnelling shields are still loosely based on Greathead's design.

Manual shield tunnelling

In early shield tunnelling, the shield functioned as a way to protect labourers who performed the digging and moved the shield forward, progressively replacing it with pre-built sections of tunnel wall.  The early deep tunnels for the London Underground were built in this way. The shield divided the workface into overlapping portions that each worker could excavate.

Modern tunnel boring machines

A tunnel boring machine (TBM) consists of a shield (a large metal cylinder) and trailing support mechanisms.

A rotating cutting wheel is located at the front end of the shield. Behind the cutting wheel there is a chamber where the excavated soil is either mixed with slurry (so-called slurry TBM) or left as-is (earth pressure balance or EPB shield), depending on the type of the TBM. The choice of TBM type depends on the soil conditions. Systems are also present for removal of the soil (or the soil mixed with slurry).

Behind the chamber there is a set of hydraulic jacks supported by the finished part of the tunnel which are used to push the TBM forward. Once a certain distance has been excavated (roughly ), a new tunnel ring is built using the erector. The erector is a rotating system which picks up precast concrete segments and places them in the desired position.

Several support mechanisms can be found behind the shield, inside the finished part of the tunnel, which are part of the TBM: dirt removal, slurry pipelines if applicable, control rooms, rails for transport of the precast segments, etc.

Lining
The tunnel lining is the wall of the tunnel. It usually consists of precast concrete segments which form rings. Cast iron linings were traditionally used in the London Underground tunnels, while steel liners were sometimes used elsewhere. The concept of using precast moulded lining sections is not new and was first patented in 1874 by James Henry Greathead.

Shields in Japan

In Japan there are several innovative approaches to shield tunnelling, e.g. the Double-O-Tube or DOT-tunnel. 
 This tunnel looks like two overlapping circles. There are also shields with computerized arms which can be used to dig a tunnel in virtually any shape.

See also
 Longwall mining, a coal-mining method using a series of hydraulic shields

References

External links 
 A picture of manual tunneling using a Greathead shield